The Sacred Heart Catholic Church and Rectory in Prescott, Arizona, United States is a complex of buildings that is listed on the National Register of Historic Places.  In 2016, it serves as the Prescott Center for the Arts, formerly the Prescott Fine Arts Association.  It is the former home of the Sacred Heart Catholic Church, founded in 1871 now located at 150 Fleury Avenue in Prescott.

The church is asserted to be "one of the best examples of nineteenth century religious architecture in Arizona".  It was designed by architect Frank Parker and was built in 1915.  It had a steeple until it was destroyed in a storm in 1930.  The buildings served the parish until 1969.

References

External links

 Sacred Heart Catholic Church, official website

Churches on the National Register of Historic Places in Arizona
Gothic Revival church buildings in Arizona
Roman Catholic churches completed in 1894
Former Roman Catholic church buildings in the United States
Buildings and structures in Prescott, Arizona
1894 establishments in Arizona Territory
National Register of Historic Places in Prescott, Arizona
19th-century Roman Catholic church buildings in the United States